SoGK Charlo is a sports club in Svarte, Sweden, established in 1938.

The women's soccer team played four seasons in the Swedish top division between 1978–1982.

References

External links
Official website 

Football clubs in Skåne County
Sports clubs established in 1938
Sport in Skåne County
1938 establishments in Sweden